David Lancaster (born 8 September 1961) is an English former footballer who played for Blackpool, Chesterfield, Rochdale and Bury.

In the 1993-94 season, he was joint top goalscorer for Rochdale.

References

Blackpool F.C. players
Chesterfield F.C. players
Rochdale A.F.C. players
Bury F.C. players
Leyland Motors F.C. players
Morecambe F.C. players
Colne Dynamoes F.C. players
Telford United F.C. players
Halifax Town A.F.C. players
Bamber Bridge F.C. players
English footballers
Footballers from Preston, Lancashire
1961 births
Living people
Association football forwards